The Magazine Antiques is a bimonthly arts publication that focuses on architecture, interior design, and fine and decorative arts. Regular monthly columns include news on current exhibitions and art-world events, notes on collecting, and book reviews.

History
Antiques was founded in 1922. The magazine underwent a complete redesign in 2009. The head-of-title note "The Magazine" first appeared in January 1928, but was not used between August 1952 and February 1971.

The publication claims a readership of 150,000 and was previously published by Brant Publications, a company founded in 1984 by Peter M. Brant, a newsprint magnate and art collector. In 2016 The Magazine Antiques, along with ARTnews, Art in America and Modern Magazine, became acquired by Art Media Holdings.  

Historian Wendell Garrett, later an appraiser on  Antiques Roadshow, served as the magazine's editor from 1972 to 1990. He remained editor at large until his death in 2012. Another editor, from 1939 until 1972, was Alice Winchester, a pioneer historian of American folk art.

Antiques is currently edited by Gregory Cerio, the sixth editor since the publication's founding. He previously worked as a senior features editor for House & Garden magazine from 1998 to 2007 and was founding editor of Modern Magazine from 2009 to 2012.

Footnotes

External links
 
 Art Media Holdings

Visual arts magazines published in the United States
Monthly magazines published in the United States
Quarterly magazines published in the United States
Magazines established in 1922
Magazines published in New York City